Oswald Marian Balzer (23 January 1858 in Chodorów – 11 January 1933 in Lwów) was a Polish historian of law and statehood, one of the most renowned Polish historians of his times.

In 1887 he became a professor at the University of Lwów. Between 1895 and 1896 he also briefly served as its rector. Since 1891 until his death he was also the director of City Archives in Lwów. His best work is Genealogia Piastów (1895). In 1888 he was offered a seat in the Polish Academy of Skills, as well as several other scientific societies, both in Poland and abroad. In 1901 he founded the Society for the Support of Polish Science in Lwów (Towarzystwo dla Popierania Nauki Polskiej we Lwowie), the first such society in the city, later to be renamed to Lwow Scientific Society (1920). Among the fields of his studies were the history of Polish statehood and Poland's historical law, as well as the early history of Slavic states.

He was buried in the Łyczakowski Cemetery.

Works 
 Kancelarye i akta grodzkie w wieku XVIII (1882)
 Geneza Trybunału Koronnego (1886)
 Regestr złoczyńców grodu sanockiego: 1554–1638 (1891)
 Walka o Tron krakowski w latach 1202–1210/11 (1894)
 Genealogia Piastów (1895)
 O następstwie tronu w Polsce (1897)
 Historia ustroju Austrii w zarysie (1899)
 O zadrudze słowiańskiej (1899)
 Z powodu nowego zarysu historii ustroju Polski (1906)
 O Morskie Oko. Wywód praw polskich przed sądem polubownym w Gradcu (Grazu)] (1906)
 O kilku kwestiach spornych z historii ustroju Polski (1907)
 Państwo polskie w pierwszym siedemdziesięcioleciu XIV i XVI wieku (1907)
 Skartabelat w ustroju szlachectwa polskiego (1911)
 Stolice Polski 963–1138 (1916)
 Skarbiec i Archiwum koronne w dobie przedjagiellońskiej] (1917)
 Królestwo Polskie 1295–1370, t. I-III (1919–1920)
 Narzaz w systemie danin książęcych pierwotnej Polski (1928)
 Corpus iuris Polonici 1506–1522, t. III oraz cz. I tomu IV obejmująca lata 1523–1534 (1906; 1910)
 Porządek sądów i spraw prawa ormiańskiego z r. 1604 (1912)
 Przegląd palatynów polskich w czasie panowania Piastów, w: Pisma pośmiertne, t. III (1937)

References

20th-century Polish historians
Polish male non-fiction writers
Historians of Poland
Polish genealogists
Members of the Lwów Scientific Society
1858 births
1933 deaths
People from Khodoriv
Academic staff of the University of Lviv
University of Lviv rectors
19th-century Polish lawyers
19th-century Polish historians
19th-century Polish educators
20th-century Polish lawyers
20th-century Polish writers
20th-century Polish educators
Burials at Lychakiv Cemetery
Recipients of the Order of the White Eagle (Poland)